Eliza is a female given name in English, meaning "pledged to God" or "joyful."

Etymology
The name first developed as a diminutive of Elizabeth in the 16th century and its use as an independent name started in the 18th century.
The name Elizabeth has been around since the Middle Ages, mainly popularised by the French (using the spelling Elisabeth). Elizabeth with a “z” is the typical spelling in English. Elizabeth is found in the Bible (Luke 1:57) as the mother of John the Baptist.
Elizabeth became popularised during the late medieval period as a given name, mostly influenced by two saints – St. Elizabeth of Hungary and St. Elizabeth of Portugal. It was brought to England by the French and the English can be credited with the formation of Eliza as a hypocorism (the French use Élise).

It may also be used as a variant of the Hebrew name Aliza, עַלִיזָה meaning "joyful".

People with this name
 Eliza Bennett (born 1992), English actress
 Eliza Brightwen (1830–1906), Scottish naturalist
 Eliza Carthy (born 1975), English folk musician
 Eliza Chulkhurst (1100–34 or 1500–34), conjoined twin
 Eliza Archard Conner (1838–1912), American journalist, lecturer, feminist 
 Eliza Doolittle (singer) (born 1988), British singer
 Eliza Ann Dupuy (ca. 1814–1880), American author 
 Eliza Dushku (born 1980), American actress
 Eliza Lee Cabot Follen (1787–1860), American writer, editor, abolitionist
 Eliza Fraser (c.1798–1858), Scottish woman after whom Fraser Island in Australia is named
 Elizabeth "Eliza" Schuyler Hamilton (1757–1854), American philanthropist and wife of United States Founding Father Alexander Hamilton
 Eliza Putnam Heaton (1860–1919), American journalist, editor
 Eliza Parks Hegan (1861–1917), Canadian nurse
 Eliza Trask Hill (1840–1908), American activist, journalist, philanthropist
 Eliza Hamilton Holly (1799–1859), seventh child and second daughter of Alexander Hamilton and Elizabeth Schuyler Hamilton
 Eliza Junor (1804–1861), Scotswoman of mixed race who was the daughter of a former slave owner
 Eliza D. Keith (1854–1939), American educator, suffragist, journalist 
 Eliza Maria Mosher (1846–1928), American physician, educator, medical writer, inventor 
 Eliza Monroe Hay (1786–1840), American socialite and acting First Lady
 Eliza O'Flaherty (1818–1882) Australian writer and stage actress
 Eliza Orzeszkowa (1841–1910), Polish writer nominated for the Nobel prize
 Eliza Hall Nutt Parsley (1842–1920), American philanthropist and school founder
 Eliza A. Pittsinger (1837–1908), American poet
 Eliza Ridgely (1803–1867), American heiress and socialite
 Eliza Sam (born 1984), Canadian actress based in Hong Kong
 Eliza Seymour Lee (1800–1874), American pastry chef and restaurateur
 Eliza Soutsou (1837–1887), Greek writer and translator
 Eliza Read Sunderland (1839–1910), American writer, educator, lecturer, women's rights advocate
 Eliza Taylor-Cotter (born 1989), Australian actress
 Eliza Townsend (1788–1854), American poet
 Eliza Vozemberg (born 1956), Greek lawyer and politician

Fictional characters
Characters in literary and screen works known solely as Eliza include:
 Eliza (Uncle Tom's Cabin), a slave from Uncle Tom's Cabin
 Eliza (Stephenson character), a socialite from Neal Stephenson's Baroque Cycle of novels
 Eliza, the wife in the Eliza series of novels by Barry Pain
 Eliza, a ghost child in short film Tormented
 Eliza, love interest of Faust VIII in the manga Shaman King
 Eliza, a female narcoleptic vampire from the Tekken series
 Eliza (Real name Neferu), a singer, model and diva from Skullgirls
Characters that have the first name Eliza and a known last name include:
 Elizabeth "Eliza" Bennet in the novel Pride and Prejudice
 Elizabeth "Eliza" Doolittle in the play Pygmalion (played by Mrs. Patrick Campbell) and the musical inspired by it, My Fair Lady (played on stage by Julie Andrews and in the film by Audrey Hepburn) 
 Eliza and Neil was a second boss in Fantastic Parodius and Otomedius.
 Eliza Fletcher, a character in the Phineas and Ferb episode My Fair Goalie who was inspired by Eliza Doolittle.
 Eliza Thornberry, voiced by Lacey Chabert in The Wild Thornberrys
 Eliza Makepeace, one of the main characters in The Forgotten Garden, from Australian author Kate Morton
 Eliza Danvers, Kara Danvers/Supergirl's foster mother in Supergirl, played by Helen Slater
 Eliza Cohen, a female FBI SWAT operator from Tom Clancy's Rainbow Six Siege
Eliza Fisher, a main character debuting in the second and final season of Siren in which she is a blonde mermaid
Eliza Cassan, one of the news reporters seen in the Deus Ex videogame saga.
Eliza Dooley, a main character of the tv series Selfie
Eliza Aitan, police department lead detective in ''Workaholic

See also
Elisa (given name)
Eliza (disambiguation)

References

English feminine given names
Feminine given names